Siltcoos Lake (silt’-koos), at , is the largest lake on the Oregon Coast of the United States. Its name comes from a Lower Umpqua (Siuslaw) placename, a variant of which is Tsiltcoos.

A dam about a half-mile downriver regulates the lake's outflow.

Geology and biology
Siltcoos Lake is a submerged remnant of a Siltcoos River delta that existed before the most recent ice age. The lake formed after melting glaciers caused a rise in sea level that drowned the lower reaches of Oregon's coastal rivers. Sediments from the sluggish rivers formed sand dunes, behind which the ancestral mouths of rivers like the Siltcoos became lakes. Nearby Woahink Lake and Tahkenitch Lake are similar remnants.

Fed mainly by four small freshwater tributaries—Woahink, Fiddle, Maple, and Lane creeks—the lake is very shallow. The shallowness contributes to the lake's eutrophic nature, related to extensive populations of Elodea, Myriophyllum, and other aquatic plants. A wide variety of warm-water fish thrive in the lake, where nutrients are plentiful, but these nutrients have also led historically to troublesome algal blooms.

Some of the residents of Dunes City and nearby areas depend on the lake for drinking water. For 52 days in the fall of 2007, state and local authorities advised against domestic use of the lake water because of a dense bloom of Anabaena planktonica, a blue-green algal species that can produce toxins. The Oregon Department of Environmental Quality (DEQ) has placed the lake on its list of impaired water bodies because of its problems with algae.

Recreation
Siltcoos Lake is a popular destination for fishing and is home to many warm-water species as well as transient seagoing fish such as Coho salmon and steelhead. The state record coho salmon was caught on this lake. The state record coastal cutthroat trout was caught here in 1984 by Kay Schmidt, 6 lbs 4 oz.

Camping is available at several spots within a few miles of the lake. These include the iconic Darlings Marina and RV resort, located on North Beach of Siltcoos lake, ADA fishing resort located on Fiddle creek, Tyee Campground along the Siltcoos River; Waxmyrtle and Lagoon campgrounds, accessible from U.S. Route 101 south of the lake, and Driftwood II Campground, west of Lagoon Campground.

Siltcoos Lake Seaplane Base is located at the lake. Base headquarters are in Westlake.

See also
 List of lakes in Oregon

References

External links

Lakes of Oregon
Lakes of Douglas County, Oregon
Lakes of Lane County, Oregon